Alberto Pier Anthony Profumo, 4th Baron Profumo, KC (20 April 1879 – 27 March 1940), was an English barrister.

The Profumo family is of Italian origin. Albert Profumo held the title of 4th Baron Profumo in the nobility of the Kingdom of Sardinia. Profumo was born in Lambeth, London, England in 1879.
His family made their fortune in insurance. He owned much of the Provident Life of London. He died in 1940 in Avon Dassett, Warwickshire aged 60. He was succeeded as Baron by his son, politician John Profumo. His grandson is David, 6th Baron Profumo.

His daughter Mary Ainslie Profumo married The 1st Baron Balfour of Inchrye.

References

1879 births
1940 deaths
English barristers
Barons in the Peerage of Sardinia
English people of Italian descent